The 1990 BMW Open was an Association of Tennis Professionals men's tennis tournament held in Munich, West Germany. The tournament was held from 30 April through 7 May 1990. Unseeded Karel Nováček won the singles title.

Finals

Singles

 Karel Nováček defeated  Thomas Muster 6–4, 6–2
 It was Novacek's only title of the year and the 3rd of his career.

Doubles

 Udo Riglewski /  Michael Stich defeated  Petr Korda /  Tomáš Šmíd 6–1, 6–4
 It was Riglewski's 3rd title of the year and the 8th of his career. It was Stich's 3rd title of the year and the 4th of his career.

References

External links 
 ATP tournament profile
 

 
Bavarian International Tennis Championships
BMW Open
BMW Open
BMW Open
German